Stephen "Steve" Bice (born October 5, 1981 in Sarnia, Ontario) is a Canadian curler from Milton, Ontario. He is currently the alternate for his brother Mark's rink.

Career
Bice was a former alternate on Glenn Howard's team.

The 2007 Ontario Men's Curling Championship took place in Bice's hometown of Sarnia. Bice was on the spare list, and when Howard's second Brent Laing had to leave the tournament because his wife was giving birth, Bice was picked up to play on the team. The team won the provincials, and he was kept for the 2007 Tim Hortons Brier, which the team also won. He capped off the season by winning the 2007 Ford World Men's Curling Championship. Bice would remain on as alternate for the 2008, 2009 and 2010 Tim Hortons Briers. He threw just a combined 17 shots in all four Briers.

Bice will return to the Brier once again as an alternate, this time for Greg Balsdon. The team won the 2014 Travelers Tankard and will play in the 2014 Tim Hortons Brier.

Personal life
Bice is employed as a chemical technician for Ontario Power Generation. He is married and has one child.

References

External links

Living people
1981 births
People from Milton, Ontario
Sportspeople from Sarnia
Canadian male curlers
Curlers from Ontario
World curling champions
Brier champions